is a Japanese singer. She performed the singing voice of Mylene Flare Jenius in Macross 7 anime and related products. She has released multiple albums, debuting her first one in 1995.

Her daughter is Hana Sugisaki, an actress.

External links
 
Chie Kajiura (Japanese)
TRIP MATE ~Chie Kajiura Fan Site~

Japanese women singers
Living people
Year of birth missing (living people)
Place of birth missing (living people)